James Richmond (22 March 1858 – 13 January 1898) was a Scottish footballer who played as a forward.

Career
Born in Glasgow, Richmond played club football for Clydesdale and Queen's Park, and he made three appearances for Scotland, including scoring on his debut in 1877.

References

1858 births
1898 deaths
Scottish footballers
Scotland international footballers
Clydesdale F.C. players
Queen's Park F.C. players
Association football forwards
Place of death missing